Ademović is a predominantly Bosniak surname, derived from the Turkish Adem, which is both a personal name ("Adam") and a word meaning "man". Notable people with the surname include:

Ahmed Ademović (1873–1965), Serbian trumpeter
Alen Ademović, former member of Serbian pop band Miligram
Edin Ademović (born 1987), Serbian-Bosnian footballer

See also
Adamović

Bosnian surnames